Located in Woltersdorf near Berlin, Fidushaus was once home of the Jugendstil artist Fidus (Hugo Reinhold Karl Johann Höppener).
Today it is a national treasure.

The situation for Fidushaus today is not a good one. There have been several attempts at restoring it and making it into a museum, none of which have been successful. Though the condition of the house was restored at a price of 1.6 million marks.

The building was declared a national monument. There has been some concern about the house attracting Far-Right tourist attention due to Fidus' enrollment in the Nazi Party at one point. Fidushaus has a sophisticated skylight arrangement on its roof. Many artists at one time lived in the area of the house, forming a colony.

References

External links 
Fidushaus

German painters
German illustrators
German Symbolist painters
1868 births
1948 deaths
Art Nouveau painters
Art Nouveau illustrators